Elections to South Cambridgeshire District Council took place on Thursday 7 May 2015, as part of the 2015 United Kingdom local elections. The election was held at the same time as the United Kingdom general election. Nineteen seats, making up one third of South Cambridgeshire District Council, were up for election. Seats up for election in 2015 were last contested at the 2011 election.

Summary
The list of candidates was published on 9 April 2015. The Conservative Party and the Labour Party stood candidates in all 19 wards up for election. The Green Party had 17 candidates, the Liberal Democrats had 14 candidates and the United Kingdom Independence Party had six candidates. There were two independent candidates.

Results

Results by ward

References

2015
2015 English local elections
May 2015 events in the United Kingdom
2010s in Cambridgeshire